Sissala West is one of the constituencies represented in the Parliament of Ghana. It elects one Member of Parliament (MP) by the first past the post system of election. Sissala West is located in the Sissala West district  of the Upper West Region of Ghana.

This seat was created prior to the  Ghanaian parliamentary election in 2004.

Boundaries
The seat is located within the Sissala West District of the Upper West Region of Ghana. To the north is Burkina Faso. Its western neighbours are the Jirapa, Lambussie and Nadowli East constituencies. The Nadowli East constituency continues round the south and to the east is the Sissala East constituency.

History 
The constituency was first created in 2004 by the Electoral Commission of Ghana along with 29 other new ones, increasing the number of constituencies from 200 to 230. This was done by splitting the previous Sissala constituency into the Sissala East and Sissala West constituencies respectively.

Members of Parliament

Elections

See also
List of Ghana Parliament constituencies

References 

Parliamentary constituencies in the Upper West Region